Justin Pasfield (born 30 May 1985) is an Australian professional goalkeeper who last played for Wollongong Wolves in the National Premier Leagues NSW.

He was part of the Joeys squad for the 2005 FIFA World Youth Championship in the Netherlands, and previously played for Bray Wanderers in the League of Ireland, Wollongong Wolves in the National Soccer League and Central Coast Mariners in the A-League.

Club career
Pasfield was understudy to Clint Bolton at Sydney FC in the A-League during the 2005–06 and 2006–07 seasons, but failed to take the pitch in a competitive match. He joined NSWPL club Sydney United on loan during Sydney FC's AFC Champions League 2007 campaign, the move made permanent at the close of the group stage when he was released from the A-League side.

Seeking a return to the top flight, he recently trialled at Newcastle Jets, and was named as a backup to first choice Ante Čović for the Jets A-League Pre-season Cup games. He has been training with Queen's Park Rangers in the Championship alongside veteran Australian goalkeeper, Mark Bosnich.

On 4 December, he signed a six-week short-term deal with the Newcastle Jets, replacing the injured Ben Kennedy.

In 2009 Pasfield joined fledgling A-League club, North Queensland Fury.

Thanks to FFA dragging its feet with the decision on what amount of the club's annual losses it was willing to fund, Pasfield decided to move onto the Central Coast Mariners at the end of the 2010/11 season, bringing to an end his time at the Fury, where he became one of the crowd favourites.

A-League career statistics

CS = Clean Sheets

1 - Includes FIFA Club World Cup statistics; AFC Champions League statistics are included in season commencing during group stages (i.e. ACL 2013 and A-League season 2012–13 etc.)

Honours
With Sydney FC:
 A-League Championship: 2005–2006
 Oceania Club Championship: 2004–2005
With Central Coast Mariners:
 A-League Premiership: 2011–2012
 A-League Championship: 2012–2013
With Sydney United:
 Waratah Cup: 2015
With Wollongong Wolves:
 National Premier Leagues NSW Premiership: 2019

References

External links
 North Queensland Fury profile

1985 births
Living people
Sportspeople from Wollongong
Association football goalkeepers
A-League Men players
National Premier Leagues players
Australian soccer players
Australia youth international soccer players
Australia under-20 international soccer players
League of Ireland players
Wollongong Wolves FC players
Bray Wanderers F.C. players
Sydney FC players
Sydney United 58 FC players
Brisbane Roar FC players
Newcastle Jets FC players
Northern Fury FC players
Central Coast Mariners FC players
Tampines Rovers FC players
Expatriate footballers in Singapore
Singapore Premier League players